Gino Bosz (born 23 April 1993) is a Dutch professional footballer who plays as a centre back for Greek Super League 2 club Doxa Drama.

Club career
Born in Rotterdam, Bosz joined Vitesse's youth setup in 2011. He was promoted to the main squad in the 2014 summer by manager (and father) Peter Bosz.

Bosz made his first-team – and Eredivisie – debut on 3 October 2014, coming on as a late substitute in a 6–1 home routing over ADO Den Haag. In summer 2015 he left Vitesse for Heracles, only to move on to Cambuur a year later due to a lack of playing time at Heracles.

Following a spell back at Vitesse, Bosz agreed to return to Eerste Divisie side Go Ahead Eagles prior to the 2018–19 campaign.

Personal life
Bosz's father, Peter was also a footballer and is a manager at Olympique lyonnais, while his brother Sonny is also a footballer.

Career statistics

References

External links
 
 
 

1993 births
Living people
Footballers from Rotterdam
Association football central defenders
Dutch footballers
SBV Vitesse players
Heracles Almelo players
SC Cambuur players
Go Ahead Eagles players
Eredivisie players
Eerste Divisie players